Thomas Curran (1840 – 13 August 1913) was an Irish nationalist politician from County Donegal who served as an Member of Parliament (MP) for the Anti-Parnellite Irish National Federation in the United Kingdom House of Commons.

He was elected as MP for the South Sligo at the 1892 general election, and held the seat until the 1900 general election. His son Thomas Bartholomew Curran (1870–1929) sat in Parliament for the same period, as MP first for Kilkenny City and then for North Donegal.

Both father and son owed their election to the Irish National Federation to whom Thomas senior made an unsecured loan of £10,000 to fund their campaign in the 1892 general election. According to Tim Healy:

References

External links 
 

1840 births
1913 deaths
Members of the Parliament of the United Kingdom for County Sligo constituencies (1801–1922)
UK MPs 1892–1895
UK MPs 1895–1900
Anti-Parnellite MPs
Politicians from County Donegal